Lambkin is a dialect term for a young lamb. 

Lambkin may refer to:
Lamkin, Child Ballad
Lambkin (cat) a recent breed of short-legged, curly coated cat, a cross of the Munchkin and LaPerm breeds
The Lambkin (1881–1900), British racehorse

People with the name
David Lambkin, an English novelist
Deborah Lambkin (born 1970), an Irish botanical artist
Marcus Lambkin (born 1971), known as Shit Robot, Irish electronic musician and DJ